Maršiči is a small settlement in the City Municipality of Koper in the Littoral region of Slovenia on the border with Croatia.

References

External links
Maršiči on Geopedia

Populated places in the City Municipality of Koper